On 3 March 2022 a major forest fire started in Uljin, South Korea, which threatened threatened a liquified natural gas plant and the Hanul Nuclear Power Plant. It burned over 20,923 hectares of land, and by the end of its first day 3995 people been evacuated. It was finally extinguished on 15 April 2022,  and required Korean Army and US. Army support. Extinguishing the blaze required 84 helicopters,  3970 Korean firefighting service personnel, 1600 servicemen from the South Korean military, and personnel and helicopters from the US Army.

References

2022 in Korea
Fires in South Korea
2022 wildfires
North Gyeongsang Province